The Wauwatosa School District is a comprehensive community public school district that serves student in prekindergarten through twelfth grade from Wauwatosa, Wisconsin, United States.

History

In August 2022 the school district established a new curriculum for sex education.

In October 2022 Beck Andrew Salgado of the Milwaukee Journal Sentinel wrote that the "stability" of the district was damaged by political pressures and by some fights that occurred on campuses.

In late October 2022 members of Moms for Liberty and other right wing groups went to a meeting of the board of trustees, and police intervened.

Schools
Schools in the district (with 2016-17 enrollment from the National Center for Education Statistics) are as follows:

Elementary schools (grades K-5)
Eisenhower Elementary - 390 students
Jefferson Elementary - 277 students
Lincoln Elementary - 303 students
Madison Elementary - 310 students
McKinley Elementary - 414 students
Roosevelt Elementary - 395 students
Underwood Elementary - 288 students
Washington Elementary - 341 students
Wauwatosa STEM School - 133 students
Wilson Elementary - 147 students

Montessori Schools (grades K-8)
Wauwatosa Montessori School - 165 students

Middle schools (grades 6-8)
Longfellow Middle - 874 students
Whitman Middle - 709 students

High schools (grades 9-12)
Wauwatosa East High School - 1,088 students
Wauwatosa West High School - 1,071 students

Other
Alternative Program
Additional WSD services are provided to juvenile residents of the Milwaukee County Grounds—at Children's Hospital of Wisconsin and the Milwaukee County's Children and Adolescent Services Center—through the River Hills School on the Milwaukee County Mental Health Complex grounds. County juveniles in secure detention receive educational services through the Vel R. Phillips Juvenile Justice Center School within the Milwaukee County Children's Court building.

References

External links
Wauwatosa School District

Education in Milwaukee County, Wisconsin
School districts in Wisconsin
Wauwatosa, Wisconsin